Akira Sebastián Taira (born 15 July 1994) is an Argentine footballer who plays as a defender. He is a free agent.

Career
Taira was selected into Comunicaciones' first-team squad for the 2012–13 Primera B Metropolitana season, subsequently making his professional debut in November 2012 during a 0–0 draw with Tristán Suárez; he also featured a week later versus Deportivo Morón, a game which also ended goalless. On 30 June 2015, Ituzaingó completed the signing of Taira. Nineteen appearances followed across the 2015 and 2016 Primera C Metropolitana seasons. Taira joined Central Ballester in June 2016, but left months after following just one appearance for the club.

Career statistics
.

References

External links

1994 births
Living people
Footballers from Buenos Aires
Argentine people of Japanese descent
Sportspeople of Japanese descent
Argentine footballers
Association football defenders
Primera B Metropolitana players
Primera C Metropolitana players
Club Comunicaciones footballers
Club Atlético Ituzaingó players
Central Ballester players